Namyang station is a railway station in Namyang-rodongjagu, Onsŏng county, North Hamgyŏng, North Korea, on the Hambuk Line of the Korean State Railway, and there is a bridge across the Tumen River, giving a connection to the Chinese railway network at Tumen, China via the Namyang Border Line.

There are servicing facilities for freight cars located here.

History
It was opened by the Chosen Government Railway on 1 December 1932, together with the rest of the Namyang-P'ungri section of the former East Tomun Line (Tonggwanjin–Unggi).

Services

Freight
Some cross-border freight traffic between the DPRK and China is handled at Namyang station; the primary exports shipped through Namyang to China are magnetite, talc and steel, and the main import is coke.

Passenger

A number of passenger trains serve Namyang station, including the semi-express trains 113/114, operating between West P'yŏngyang and Unsŏng via Ch'ŏngjin and Hoeryŏng. There are also long-distance trains Kalma-Ch'ŏngjin-Hoeryŏng-Rajin; Ch'ŏngjin-Hoeryŏng-Rajin; Haeju-Ch'ŏngjin-Hoeryŏng-Unsŏng; and Tanch'ŏn-Ch'ŏngjin-Hoeryŏng-Tumangang. There is also a commuter service operated between Namyang and Hunyung.

References

Railway stations in North Korea